The Peres–Horodecki criterion is a necessary condition, for the joint density matrix  of two quantum mechanical systems  and , to be separable. It is also called the PPT criterion, for positive partial transpose. In the 2×2 and 2×3 dimensional cases the condition is also sufficient. It is used to decide the separability of mixed states, where the Schmidt decomposition does not apply. The theorem was discovered in 1996 by Asher Peres and the Horodecki family (Michał, Paweł, and Ryszard)

In higher dimensions, the test is inconclusive, and one should supplement it with more advanced tests, such as those based on entanglement witnesses.

Definition

If we have a general state  which acts on 

Its partial transpose (with respect to the B party) is defined as

Note that the partial in the name implies that only part of the state is transposed. More precisely,  is the identity map applied to the A party and the transposition map applied to the B party.

This definition can be seen more clearly if we write the state as a block matrix:

Where , and each block is a square matrix of dimension . Then the partial transpose is

In other words, if  has a negative eigenvalue,  is guaranteed to be entangled.

The result is independent of the party that was transposed, because .

Example

Consider this 2-qubit family of Werner states:

and the identity element, a maximally mixed state.

Its density matrix is

and the partial transpose

Demonstration

If ρ is separable, it can be written as

In this case, the effect of the partial transposition is trivial:

Thus  must also be positive semidefinite. This proves the necessity of the PPT criterion.

Showing that being PPT is also sufficient for the 2 X 2 and 3 X 2 (equivalently 2 X 3) cases is more involved. It was shown by the Horodeckis that for every entangled state there exists an entanglement witness. This is a result of geometric nature and invokes the Hahn–Banach theorem (see reference below).

From the existence of entanglement witnesses, one can show that  being positive for all positive maps Λ is a necessary and sufficient condition for the separability of ρ, where Λ maps  to 

In other words, every such map Λ can be written as

This follows from the Størmer-Woronowicz theorem.

Loosely speaking, the transposition map is therefore the only one that can generate negative eigenvalues in these dimensions. So if  is positive,  is positive for any Λ. Thus we conclude that the Peres–Horodecki criterion is also sufficient for separability when .

In higher dimensions, however, there exist maps that can't be decomposed in this fashion, and the criterion is no longer sufficient. Consequently, there are entangled states which have a positive partial transpose. Such states have the interesting property that they are bound entangled, i.e. they can not be distilled for quantum communication purposes.

Continuous variable systems

The Peres–Horodecki criterion has been extended to continuous variable systems. Rajiah Simon formulated a particular version of the PPT criterion in terms of the second-order moments of canonical operators and showed that it is necessary and sufficient for -mode Gaussian states (see Ref. for a seemingly different but essentially equivalent approach). It was later found  that Simon's condition is also necessary and sufficient for -mode Gaussian states, but no longer sufficient for -mode Gaussian states. Simon's condition can be generalized by taking into account the higher order moments of canonical operators  or by using entropic measures.

Symmetric systems

For symmetric states of bipartite systems, the positivity of the partial transpose of the density matrix is related to the sign of certain two-body correlations. Here, symmetry means that

A full basis of the symmetric subspace is of the form  with 
is the dimension of the two parties.

It can be shown that for such states,  has a positive partial transpose if and only if 

holds for all operators  Hence, if  holds for some  then the
state possesses non-PPT entanglement.

References

 Karol Życzkowski and Ingemar Bengtsson, Geometry of Quantum States, Cambridge University Press, 2006
 

Quantum information theory